Tara Drysdale (born 30 January 1979) is a New Zealand field hockey player who competed in the 2004 Summer Olympics and in the 2008 Summer Olympics.

References

External links
 

1979 births
Living people
New Zealand female field hockey players
Olympic field hockey players of New Zealand
Field hockey players at the 2004 Summer Olympics
Field hockey players at the 2008 Summer Olympics
People educated at Tararua College
21st-century New Zealand women